Thomas Elliott Barras (born 7 January 1994) is a British rower. He won a bronze medal in the single scull at the 2017 World Championships and a silver medal in the quadruple scull at the Tokyo 2020 Olympic Games. He is also a qualified physiotherapist, having graduated with a degree in Physiotherapy from Cardiff University.

References

External links

Tom Barras at British Rowing

1994 births
Living people
British male rowers
World Rowing Championships medalists for Great Britain
Olympic rowers of Great Britain
Rowers at the 2020 Summer Olympics
Medalists at the 2020 Summer Olympics
Olympic silver medallists for Great Britain
Olympic medalists in rowing
21st-century British people